The Philosophy of Momus is the ninth studio album by Scottish musician Momus. It was released on 1 April 1995 through Nippon Columbia in Japan, and Cherry Red Records in the United Kingdom.

Background 
The Philosophy of Momus was the first album released after leaving Creation Records, and the second album released on Nippon Columbia, Momus's first major label. It also was one of the first albums released after gaining a cult following in the USA, and mainstream status in Japan. Though Momus claimed in a 1995 interview with Kill Pearl Jam Dead that much of the album's lyrical content was similar to previous releases, he increasingly became interested in Japanese subjects, reflective of his collaborations with artists like Kahimi Karie and newfound popularity in Japan.

The album was released the year following Momus's marriage to Shazna Nessa, a Bangladesh-born teenager, and their relocation to Paris. It was recorded in London and Paris.

The album frequently references figures in art and pop culture, including Jamaican record producer Lee "Scratch" Perry and Japanese eroticist Kuniyoshi Kaneko.

Track 19, "The Sadness of Things", was written by Momus with Ken Morioka, a member of Japanese electronic group Soft Ballet and frequent collaborator in the visual kei scene.

Reception 

The Philosophy of Momus received mixed reviews from the British press. Melody Maker's Mark Luffman panned the album as "a jamboree bag of aphorisms", stating its "featherweight sheen" of music was overpowered by the "cod-philosophising" of Momus' lyrics. NME's John Robinson gave the album a more positive review, rating the album 7/10. Robinson called The Philosophy of Momus "intense and witty" and compared Momus to a "Leonard Cohen for the '90s". British newspaper The Independent also gave a positive review, calling it "witty and always perfectly measured" and comparing the album's sound to the Pet Shop Boys. AllMusic's Steve Huey rated the album 6/10, praising the album's production.

Track listing

Personnel 

 Tracks 1-18 written by Nick Currie
 Music on Track 19 written by Ken Morioka
 Recorded by Nick Currie
 Mastered by Denis Blackham
 Artwork by Nick Currie
 Liner notes by Kahimi Karie

References 

1995 albums
Momus (musician) albums